Asota alienata is a moth of the family Erebidae first described by Francis Walker in 1864. It is found in Papua New Guinea and the New Hebrides.

References

Asota (moth)
Moths of Oceania
Moths described in 1864